Puss in Boots is a 1952 picture book translated and illustrated by Marcia Brown. The book is a translation of Charles Perrault's Puss in Boots. The book was a recipient of a 1953 Caldecott Honor for its illustrations.

References

1952 children's books
American picture books
Caldecott Honor-winning works